Sulfameth may refer to:
 Sulfamethoxazole
 Trimethoprim/sulfamethoxazole